Neyagawa Municipal Board of Education is a department of the city of Neyagawa in Osaka Prefecture, Japan.

Neyagawa BoE operates public elementary and junior high schools.

Schools

Junior high schools

 Neyagawa 1st Junior High School
 Neyagawa 2nd Junior High School
 Neyagawa 3rd Junior High School
 Neyagawa 4th Junior High School
 Neyagawa 5th Junior High School
 Neyagawa 6th Junior High School
 Neyagawa 7th Junior High School
 Neyagawa 8th Junior High School
 Neyagawa 9th Junior High School
 Neyagawa 10th Junior High School
 Nakakida Junior High School 
 Tomorogi Junior High School

Elementary schools

 Horimizo Elementary School
 Ikeda Elementary School
 Ishizu Elementary School
 Kamida Elementary School
 Keimei Elementary School
 Kida Elementary School
 Koya Elementary School
 Kunimatsu Midorigaoka Elementary School
 Kusune Elementary School
 Mii Elementary School
 Neyagawa Central Elementary School
 Neyagawa 5th Elementary School
 Neyagawa East Elementary School
 Neyagawa North Elementary School
 Neyagawa South Elementary School
 Neyagawa West Elementary School
 Meiwa Elementary School
 Sakura Elementary School
 Seibi Elementary School
 Shimeno Elementary School
 Tai Elementary School
 Umegaoka Elementary School
 Utani Elementary School
 Wako Elementary School

Municipal school systems in Japan
Education in Osaka Prefecture